Damian Michał Pietrasik (born 26 July 1986 in Olkusz) is a visually impaired Polish Paralympic swimmer competing in S11-classification events. He won the silver medal in the men's 100 metre backstroke S11 event at the 2008 Summer Paralympics.

At the 2009 IPC Swimming European Championships held in Reykjavik, Iceland, he won the gold medal in the men's 50 metre freestyle S11 event and the silver medals in the men's 100 metre backstroke S11 and men's 100 metre freestyle S11 events.

References

External links 
 

Living people
1986 births
People from Olkusz
Polish male backstroke swimmers
Polish male freestyle swimmers
Paralympic swimmers with a vision impairment
S11-classified Paralympic swimmers
Swimmers at the 2004 Summer Paralympics
Swimmers at the 2008 Summer Paralympics
Medalists at the 2008 Summer Paralympics
Paralympic silver medalists for Poland
Paralympic medalists in swimming
Paralympic swimmers of Poland
20th-century Polish people
21st-century Polish people
Polish blind people